The Avant Stellar is a mechanical keyboard that was produced by Creative Vision Technologies Inc (CVT). It was the successor to the popular and successful OmniKey keyboard by Northgate Computers, and was regarded as being very similar to the OmniKey Plus. It is no longer in production.

References
Footnotes

Sources

 

Further reading

External links

Definition at the PC Magazine Encyclopedia

Computer keyboard models